Araldi is a surname. Notable people with the surname include:

Alessandro Araldi ( 1460– 1529), Italian painter
Paolo Araldi (18th-century–after 1820), Italian painter

Italian-language surnames